The 2003–04 Tampa Bay Lightning season was the 12th National Hockey League season in Tampa, Florida. The Lightning won their first Stanley Cup over the Calgary Flames this season, after the Flames were attempting to be the first Canadian team to win a Stanley Cup since the 1993 Montreal Canadiens.

The Lightning's 1st Stanley Cup championship came just a year after their NFL (National Football League) counterparts, the Tampa Bay Buccaneers, won Super Bowl XXXVII, also their 1st championship.

Offseason
The Lightning did not have a first-round pick. For their first pick, they chose Mike Egener in the second round, 35th overall.

Regular season
On Saturday, December 27, 2003, the Lightning scored three short-handed goals in a 4–2 win over the Boston Bruins.

The Lightning finished the regular season having tied the Detroit Red Wings for the most short-handed goals scored, with 15.

Season standings

Playoffs

Schedule and results

Regular season

|- align="center" bgcolor="ccffcc"
| 1 || October 10 || Boston Bruins || 5–1 ||  || Khabibulin || St. Pete Times Forum || 20,454 || 1–0–0–0 || 2 || 
|- align="center" bgcolor="ccffcc"
| 2 || October 16 || Phoenix Coyotes || 5–1 ||  || Khabibulin || St. Pete Times Forum || 12,784 || 2–0–0–0 || 4 || 
|- align="center" bgcolor="ccffcc"
| 3 || October 18 || @ New Jersey Devils || 3–2 ||  || Khabibulin || Continental Airlines Arena || 15,590 || 3–0–0–0 || 6 || 
|- align="center" bgcolor="ccffcc"
| 4 || October 21 || Atlanta Thrashers || 3–2 || OT || Khabibulin || St. Pete Times Forum || 14,822 || 4–0–0–0 || 8 || 
|- align="center" bgcolor="ccffcc"
| 5 || October 23 || @ Columbus Blue Jackets || 1–0 ||  || Grahame || Nationwide Arena || 16,542 || 5–0–0–0 || 10 || 
|- align="center" bgcolor="ccffcc"
| 6 || October 25 || Minnesota Wild || 3–2 ||  || Khabibulin || St. Pete Times Forum || 16,223 || 6–0–0–0 || 12 || 
|- align="center" bgcolor="ffffcc"
| 7 || October 30 || San Jose Sharks || 2–2 || OT || Khabibulin || St. Pete Times Forum || 17,609 || 6–0–1–0 || 13 || 
|-

|- align="center" bgcolor="ccffcc"
| 8 || November 1 || Carolina Hurricanes || 4–3 ||  || Khabibulin || St. Pete Times Forum || 16,616 || 7–0–1–0 || 15 || 
|- align="center" bgcolor="ffcccc"
| 9 || November 4 || Washington Capitals || 1–5 ||  || Khabibulin || St. Pete Times Forum || 14,312 || 7–1–1–0 || 15 || 
|- align="center" bgcolor="B0C4DE"
| 10 || November 6 || Los Angeles Kings || 0–1 || OT || Grahame || St. Pete Times Forum || 14,287 || 7–1–1–1 || 16 || 
|- align="center" bgcolor="ccffcc"
| 11 || November 8 || Pittsburgh Penguins || 9–0 ||  || Khabibulin || St. Pete Times Forum || 18,262 || 8–1–1–1 || 18 || 
|- align="center" bgcolor="ffffcc"
| 12 || November 9 || @ Carolina Hurricanes || 1–1 || OT || Grahame || RBC Center || 9,821 || 8–1–2–1 || 19 || 
|- align="center" bgcolor="ffcccc"
| 13 || November 11 || @ Florida Panthers || 0–4 ||  || Khabibulin || Office Depot Center || 13,214 || 8–2–2–1 || 19 || 
|- align="center" bgcolor="ccffcc"
| 14 || November 14 || @ Washington Capitals || 5–2 ||  || Grahame || MCI Center || 14,536 || 9–2–2–1 || 21 || 
|- align="center" bgcolor="ccffcc"
| 15 || November 20 || New York Islanders || 3–2 ||  || Khabibulin || St. Pete Times Forum || 14,898 || 10–2–2–1 || 23 || 
|- align="center" bgcolor="ccffcc"
| 16 || November 22 || Buffalo Sabres || 2–1 ||  || Grahame || St. Pete Times Forum || 20,112 || 11–2–2–1 || 25 || 
|- align="center" bgcolor="ffffcc"
| 17 || November 23 || @ Carolina Hurricanes || 0–0 || OT || Khabibulin || RBC Center || 10,391 || 11–2–3–1 || 26 || 
|- align="center" bgcolor="ffcccc"
| 18 || November 25 || New York Rangers || 0–2 ||  || Khabibulin || St. Pete Times Forum || 16,034 || 11–3–3–1 || 26 || 
|- align="center" bgcolor="ffffcc"
| 19 || November 28 || St. Louis Blues || 2–2 || OT || Khabibulin || St. Pete Times Forum || 18,787 || 11–3–4–1 || 27 || 
|- align="center" bgcolor="ffcccc"
| 20 || November 28 || @ Atlanta Thrashers || 1–2 ||  || Grahame || Philips Arena || 16,847 || 11–4–4–1 || 27 || 
|-

|- align="center" bgcolor="ffcccc"
| 21 || December 2 || @ Montreal Canadiens || 2–3 ||  || Khabibulin || Bell Centre || 19,858 || 11–5–4–1 || 27 || 
|- align="center" bgcolor="ffcccc"
| 22 || December 4 || Ottawa Senators || 1–4 ||  || Grahame || St. Pete Times Forum || 15,221 || 11–6–4–1 || 27 || 
|- align="center" bgcolor="ccffcc"
| 23 || December 6 || @ Buffalo Sabres || 3–1 ||  || Khabibulin || HSBC Arena || 15,833 || 12–6–4–1 || 29 || 
|- align="center" bgcolor="ccffcc"
| 24 || December 7 || @ New York Rangers || 3–2 ||  || Grahame || Madison Square Garden || 18,200 || 13–6–4–1 || 31 || 
|- align="center" bgcolor="ffcccc"
| 25 || December 9 || @ New York Islanders || 2–5 ||  || Khabibulin || Nassau Veterans Memorial Coliseum || 10,860 || 13–7–4–1 || 31 || 
|- align="center" bgcolor="ffcccc"
| 26 || December 11 || @ Ottawa Senators || 2–3 ||  || Khabibulin || Corel Centre || 17,256 || 13–8–4–1 || 31 || 
|- align="center" bgcolor="ffcccc"
| 27 || December 13 || Montreal Canadiens || 2–5 ||  || Grahame || St. Pete Times Forum || 17,228 || 13–9–4–1 || 31 || 
|- align="center" bgcolor="ffcccc"
| 28 || December 16 || @ Toronto Maple Leafs || 0–3 ||  || Khabibulin || Air Canada Centre || 19,331 || 13–10–4–1 || 31 || 
|- align="center" bgcolor="ccffcc"
| 29 || December 18 || @ Philadelphia Flyers || 5–4 || OT || Khabibulin || Wachovia Center || 19,332 || 14–10–4–1 || 33 || 
|- align="center" bgcolor="ffcccc"
| 30 || December 20 || Dallas Stars || 1–2 ||  || Khabibulin || St. Pete Times Forum || 16,233 || 14–11–4–1 || 33 || 
|- align="center" bgcolor="ffffcc"
| 31 || December 23 || @ Boston Bruins || 1–1 || OT || Khabibulin || FleetCenter || 13,266 || 14–11–5–1 || 34 || 
|- align="center" bgcolor="ffcccc"
| 32 || December 26 || @ Atlanta Thrashers || 1–3 ||  || Khabibulin || Philips Arena || 18,545 || 14–12–5–1 || 34 || 
|- align="center" bgcolor="ccffcc"
| 33 || December 27 || Boston Bruins || 4–2 ||  || Grahame || St. Pete Times Forum || 19,942 || 15–12–5–1 || 36 || 
|- align="center" bgcolor="ffcccc"
| 34 || December 29 || Mighty Ducks of Anaheim || 0–2 ||  || Khabibulin || St. Pete Times Forum || 17,662 || 15–13–5–1 || 36 || 
|- align="center" bgcolor="ffffcc"
| 35 || December 31 || Florida Panthers || 2–2 || OT || Khabibulin || St. Pete Times Forum || 15,234 || 15–13–6–1 || 37 || 
|-

|- align="center" bgcolor="ffcccc"
| 36 || January 2 || Columbus Blue Jackets || 0–2 ||  || Grahame || St. Pete Times Forum || 13,609 || 15–14–6–1 || 37 || 
|- align="center" bgcolor="ccffcc"
| 37 || January 3 || Philadelphia Flyers || 6–1 ||  || Khabibulin || St. Pete Times Forum || 19,242 || 16–14–6–1 || 39 || 
|- align="center" bgcolor="ffcccc"
| 38 || January 6 || @ Ottawa Senators || 2–5 ||  || Khabibulin || Corel Centre || 16,890 || 16–15–6–1 || 39 || 
|- align="center" bgcolor="ccffcc"
| 39 || January 8 || @ Montreal Canadiens || 4–1 ||  || Grahame || Bell Centre || 20,706 || 17–15–6–1 || 41 || 
|- align="center" bgcolor="ccffcc"
| 40 || January 9 || @ New Jersey Devils || 4–1 ||  || Grahame || Continental Airlines Arena || 19,040 || 18–15–6–1 || 43 || 
|- align="center" bgcolor="ccffcc"
| 41 || January 11 || @ New York Rangers || 2–1 || OT || Grahame || Madison Square Garden || 18,200 || 19–15–6–1 || 45 || 
|- align="center" bgcolor="ccffcc"
| 42 || January 13 || @ Pittsburgh Penguins || 3–1 ||  || Grahame || Mellon Arena || 10,039 || 20–15–6–1 || 47 || 
|- align="center" bgcolor="ccffcc"
| 43 || January 15 || Carolina Hurricanes || 5–4 ||  || Khabibulin || St. Pete Times Forum || 19,909 || 21–15–6–1 || 49 || 
|- align="center" bgcolor="ffcccc"
| 44 || January 17 || @ Florida Panthers || 1–2 ||  || Grahame || Office Depot Center || 19,250 || 21–16–6–1 || 49 || 
|- align="center" bgcolor="B0C4DE"
| 45 || January 19 || Colorado Avalanche || 4–5 || OT || Khabibulin || St. Pete Times Forum || 19,212 || 21–16–6–2 || 50 || 
|- align="center" bgcolor="B0C4DE"
| 46 || January 21 || @ Vancouver Canucks || 4–5 || OT || Khabibulin || General Motors Place || 18,630 || 21–16–6–3 || 51 || 
|- align="center" bgcolor="ccffcc"
| 47 || January 22 || @ Edmonton Oilers || 3–2 ||  || Grahame || Rexall Place || 16,839 || 22–16–6–3 || 53 || 
|- align="center" bgcolor="ccffcc"
| 48 || January 24 || @ Calgary Flames || 6–2 ||  || Grahame || Pengrowth Saddledome || 17,109 || 23–16–6–3 || 55 || 
|- align="center" bgcolor="ccffcc"
| 49 || January 27 || @ Pittsburgh Penguins || 6–2 ||  || Grahame || Mellon Arena || 9,931 || 24–16–6–3 || 57 || 
|- align="center" bgcolor="ccffcc"
| 50 || January 29 || Pittsburgh Penguins || 5–1 ||  || Khabibulin || St. Pete Times Forum || 15,847 || 25–16–6–3 || 59 || 
|- align="center" bgcolor="ccffcc"
| 51 || January 31 || Atlanta Thrashers || 5–2 ||  || Grahame || St. Pete Times Forum || 20,762 || 26–16–6–3 || 61 || 
|-

|- align="center" bgcolor="ccffcc"
| 52 || February 2 || @ Philadelphia Flyers || 2–1 ||  || Khabibulin || Wachovia Center || 19,048 || 27–16–6–3 || 63 || 
|- align="center" bgcolor="ffcccc"
| 53 || February 3 || @ Washington Capitals || 1–2 ||  || Khabibulin || MCI Center || 13,085 || 27–17–6–3 || 63 || 
|- align="center" bgcolor="ccffcc"
| 54 || February 5 || @ Nashville Predators || 5–2 ||  || Khabibulin || Gaylord Entertainment Center || 9,879 || 28–17–6–3 || 65 || 
|- align="center" bgcolor="bbbbbb"
| colspan="11"|All-Star Break (February 6–9)
|- align="center" bgcolor="ffffcc"
| 55 || February 10 || Toronto Maple Leafs || 4–4 || OT || Khabibulin || St. Pete Times Forum || 17,222 || 28–17–7–3 || 66 || 
|- align="center" bgcolor="ccffcc"
| 56 || February 12 || Montreal Canadiens || 5–3 ||  || Grahame || St. Pete Times Forum || 15,644 || 29–17–7–3 || 68 || 
|- align="center" bgcolor="ccffcc"
| 57 || February 14 || Florida Panthers || 3–2 ||  || Grahame || St. Pete Times Forum || 18,888 || 30–17–7–3 || 70 || 
|- align="center" bgcolor="ccffcc"
| 58 || February 17 || Philadelphia Flyers || 5–2 ||  || Khabibulin || St. Pete Times Forum || 17,545 || 31–17–7–3 || 72 || 
|- align="center" bgcolor="B0C4DE"
| 59 || February 19 || @ St. Louis Blues || 3–4 || OT || Khabibulin || Savvis Center || 17,973 || 31–17–7–4 || 73 || 
|- align="center" bgcolor="B0C4DE"
| 60 || February 20 || @ Buffalo Sabres || 3–4 || OT || Grahame || HSBC Arena || 18,124 || 31–17–7–5 || 74 || 
|- align="center" bgcolor="ccffcc"
| 61 || February 23 || @ Washington Capitals || 6–3 ||  || Khabibulin || MCI Center || 16,051 || 32–17–7–5 || 76 || 
|- align="center" bgcolor="ccffcc"
| 62 || February 25 || @ Atlanta Thrashers || 4–2 ||  || Khabibulin || Philips Arena || 14,667 || 33–17–7–5 || 78 || 
|- align="center" bgcolor="ccffcc"
| 63 || February 26 || Toronto Maple Leafs || 4–3 ||  || Khabibulin || St. Pete Times Forum || 19,909 || 34–17–7–5 || 80 || 
|- align="center" bgcolor="ccffcc"
| 64 || February 28 || Washington Capitals || 4–2 ||  || Khabibulin || St. Pete Times Forum || 20,124 || 35–17–7–5 || 82 || 
|-

|- align="center" bgcolor="ccffcc"
| 65 || March 1 || @ Colorado Avalanche || 3–0 ||  || Khabibulin || Pepsi Center || 18,007 || 36–17–7–5 || 84 || 
|- align="center" bgcolor="ccffcc"
| 66 || March 3 || @ Chicago Blackhawks || 5–3 ||  || Khabibulin || United Center || 10,702 || 37–17–7–5 || 86 || 
|- align="center" bgcolor="ccffcc"
| 67 || March 5 || New Jersey Devils || 3–2 || OT || Khabibulin || St. Pete Times Forum || 20,239 || 38–17–7–5 || 88 || 
|- align="center" bgcolor="ccffcc"
| 68 || March 6 || @ Florida Panthers || 5–3 ||  || Khabibulin || Office Depot Center || 17,509 || 39–17–7–5 || 90 || 
|- align="center" bgcolor="ffffcc"
| 69 || March 8 || @ Detroit Red Wings || 1–1 || OT || Khabibulin || Joe Louis Arena || 20,066 || 39–17–8–5 || 91 || 
|- align="center" bgcolor="ccffcc"
| 70 || March 10 || @ Carolina Hurricanes || 4–2 ||  || Grahame || RBC Center || 13,531 || 40–17–8–5 || 93 || 
|- align="center" bgcolor="ccffcc"
| 71 || March 12 || New York Rangers || 5–2 ||  || Khabibulin || St. Pete Times Forum || 20,026 || 41–17–8–5 || 95 || 
|- align="center" bgcolor="ffcccc"
| 72 || March 13 || Carolina Hurricanes || 1–5 ||  || Grahame || St. Pete Times Forum || 20,237 || 41–18–8–5 || 95 || 
|- align="center" bgcolor="ffcccc"
| 73 || March 16 || New York Islanders || 1–3 ||  || Khabibulin || St. Pete Times Forum || 19,914 || 41–19–8–5 || 95 || 
|- align="center" bgcolor="ccffcc"
| 74 || March 18 || Buffalo Sabres || 1–3 ||  || Khabibulin || St. Pete Times Forum || 19,946 || 42–19–8–5 || 97 || 
|- align="center" bgcolor="ffcccc"
| 75 || March 20 || @ Boston Bruins || 4–5 ||  || Khabibulin || FleetCenter || 17,565 || 42–20–8–5 || 97 || 
|- align="center" bgcolor="ffcccc"
| 76 || March 21 || @ New York Islanders || 0–3 ||  || Grahame || Nassau Veterans Memorial Coliseum || 14,447 || 42–21–8–5 || 97 || 
|- align="center" bgcolor="ccffcc"
| 77 || March 23 || @ Toronto Maple Leafs || 7–2 ||  || Grahame || Air Canada Centre || 19,452 || 43–21–8–5 || 99 || 
|- align="center" bgcolor="ccffcc"
| 78 || March 25 || New Jersey Devils || 2–1 ||  || Khabibulin || St. Pete Times Forum || 19,013 || 44–21–8–5 || 101 || 
|- align="center" bgcolor="ccffcc"
| 79 || March 27 || Washington Capitals || 4–1 ||  || Khabibulin || St. Pete Times Forum || 18,812 || 45–21–8–5 || 103 || 
|- align="center" bgcolor="B0C4DE"
| 80 || March 29 || Ottawa Senators || 4–5 || OT || Khabibulin || St. Pete Times Forum || 19,844 || 45–21–8–6 || 104 || 
|-

|- align="center" bgcolor="ccffcc"
| 81 || April 1 || Florida Panthers || 4–3 ||  || Grahame || St. Pete Times Forum || 17,726 || 46–21–8–6 || 106 || 
|- align="center" bgcolor="ffcccc"
| 82 || April 3 || Atlanta Thrashers || 1–2 ||  || Khabibulin || St. Pete Times Forum || 20,244 || 46–22–8–6 || 106 || 
|-

|-
| Lightning score listed first;

Playoffs

|- align="center" bgcolor="ccffcc"
| 1 || April 8 || New York Islanders || 3–0 ||  || Khabibulin || St. Pete Times Forum || 18,536 || Lightning lead 1–0 || 
|- align="center" bgcolor="ffcccc"
| 2 || April 10 || New York Islanders || 0–3 ||  || Khabibulin || St. Pete Times Forum || 19,982 || Series tied 1–1 || 
|- align="center" bgcolor="ccffcc"
| 3 || April 12 || @ New York Islanders || 3–0 ||  || Khabibulin || Nassau Veterans Memorial Coliseum || 16,234 || Lightning lead 2–1 || 
|- align="center" bgcolor="ccffcc"
| 4 || April 14 || @ New York Islanders || 3–0 ||  || Khabibulin || Nassau Veterans Memorial Coliseum || 16,234 || Lightning lead 3–1 || 
|- align="center" bgcolor="ccffcc"
| 5 || April 16 || New York Islanders || 3–2 || 4:07 OT || Khabibulin || St. Pete Times Forum || 20,927 || Lightning win 4–1 || 
|-

|- align="center" bgcolor="ccffcc"
| 1 || April 23 || Montreal Canadiens || 4–0 ||  || Khabibulin || St. Pete Times Forum || 18,904 || Lightning lead 1–0 || 
|- align="center" bgcolor="ccffcc"
| 2 || April 25 || Montreal Canadiens || 3–1 ||  || Khabibulin || St. Pete Times Forum || 19,435 || Lightning lead 2–0 || 
|- align="center" bgcolor="ccffcc"
| 3 || April 27 || @ Montreal Canadiens || 3–2 || 1:05 OT || Khabibulin || Bell Centre || 21,273 || Lightning lead 3–0 || 
|- align="center" bgcolor="ccffcc"
| 4 || April 29 || @ Montreal Canadiens || 3–1 ||  || Khabibulin || Bell Centre || 21,273 || Lightning win 4–0 || 
|-

|- align="center" bgcolor="ccffcc"
| 1 || May 8 || Philadelphia Flyers || 3–1 ||  || Khabibulin || St. Pete Times Forum || 21,425 || Lightning lead 1–0 || 
|- align="center" bgcolor="ffcccc"
| 2 || May 10 || Philadelphia Flyers || 2–6 ||  || Khabibulin || St. Pete Times Forum || 21,314 || Series tied 1–1 || 
|- align="center" bgcolor="ccffcc"
| 3 || May 13 || @ Philadelphia Flyers || 4–1 ||  || Khabibulin || Wachovia Center || 19,897 || Lightning lead 2–1 || 
|- align="center" bgcolor="ffcccc"
| 4 || May 15 || @ Philadelphia Flyers || 2–3 ||  || Khabibulin || Wachovia Center || 19,872 || Series tied 2–2 || 
|- align="center" bgcolor="ccffcc"
| 5 || May 18 || Philadelphia Flyers || 4–2 ||  || Khabibulin || St. Pete Times Forum || 21,517 || Lightning lead 3–2 || 
|- align="center" bgcolor="ffcccc"
| 6 || May 20 || @ Philadelphia Flyers || 4–5 || 18:18 OT || Khabibulin || Wachovia Center || 19,910 || Series tied 3–3 || 
|- align="center" bgcolor="ccffcc"
| 7 || May 22 || Philadelphia Flyers || 2–1 ||  || Khabibulin || St. Pete Times Forum || 22,117 || Lightning win 4–3 || 
|-

|- align="center" bgcolor="ffcccc"
| 1 || May 25 || Calgary Flames || 1–4 ||  || Khabibulin || St. Pete Times Forum || 21,674 || Flames lead 1–0 || 
|- align="center" bgcolor="ccffcc"
| 2 || May 27 || Calgary Flames || 4–1 ||  || Khabibulin || St. Pete Times Forum || 22,222 || Series tied 1–1 || 
|- align="center" bgcolor="ffcccc"
| 3 || May 29 || @ Calgary Flames || 0–3 ||  || Khabibulin || Pengrowth Saddledome || 19,221 || Flames lead 2–1 || 
|- align="center" bgcolor="ccffcc"
| 4 || May 31 || @ Calgary Flames || 1–0 ||  || Khabibulin || Pengrowth Saddledome || 19,221 || Series tied 2–2 || 
|- align="center" bgcolor="ffcccc"
| 5 || June 3 || Calgary Flames || 2–3 || 14:40 OT || Khabibulin || St. Pete Times Forum || 22,426 || Flames lead 3–2 || 
|- align="center" bgcolor="ccffcc"
| 6 || June 5 || @ Calgary Flames || 3–2 || 0:33 2OT || Khabibulin || Pengrowth Saddledome || 19,221 || Series tied 3–3 || 
|- align="center" bgcolor="ccffcc"
| 7 || June 7 || Calgary Flames || 2–1 ||  || Khabibulin || St. Pete Times Forum || 22,717 || Lightning win 4–3 || 
|-

|-
| Lightning score listed first;

Player statistics

Scoring
 Position abbreviations: C = Center; D = Defense; G = Goaltender; LW = Left Wing; RW = Right Wing
  = Joined team via a transaction (e.g., trade, waivers, signing) during the season. Stats reflect time with the Lightning only.
  = Left team via a transaction (e.g., trade, waivers, release) during the season. Stats reflect time with the Lightning only.

Goaltending

Awards and records

Awards

Transactions
The Lightning were involved in the following transactions from June 10, 2003, the day after the deciding game of the 2003 Stanley Cup Finals, through June 7, 2004, the day of the deciding game of the 2004 Stanley Cup Finals.

Trades

Players acquired

Players lost

Signings

Draft picks
Tampa Bay's draft picks at the 2003 NHL Entry Draft held at the Gaylord Entertainment Center in Nashville, Tennessee.

See also
 2003–04 NHL season

Notes

References

 
 

Tam
Tam
Tampa Bay Lightning seasons
Eastern Conference (NHL) championship seasons
Stanley Cup championship seasons
Tampa
Tamp
Tamp